KNSH (100.7 FM) is a radio station broadcasting a country music format. Licensed to Fort Smith, Arkansas, United States, it serves the Fort Smith area. The station is currently owned by Cumulus Media.

History
On January 2, 2013, the then-KLSZ-FM changed their format from mainstream rock to sports, with programming from CBS Sports Radio. Under KLSZ-FM's previous sports format, program director Josh Bertaccini hosted "The Red Zone with JB" weekdays from 7 to 9 am. He has worked for the Ticket since June 2011. The Jim Rome Show aired weekdays afternoons from 11 am to 2 PM, and Doug Gottlieb hosted afternoon drive.

On August 15, 2014, KLSZ-FM changed their format from sports to country, branded as "100.7 Nash Icon".

On October 31, 2016, KLSZ-FM rebranded as "100.7 Nash FM". The KNSH call letters were moved to Fort Smith on February 20, 2020, from a station in Canyon, Texas, whose license was about to be surrendered to the FCC.

References

External links

NSH
Cumulus Media radio stations
Radio stations established in 1979
1979 establishments in Arkansas
Country radio stations in the United States